This is a list of fictional Jewish comic book characters. Characters on this list range from secular with Jewish parentage to fully practicing. These are characters specific to comic-book universes; characters from TV or film universes are not present on this list, nor are characters from autobiographical/memoir comics such as Maus and American Splendor.

DC Comics

 Alice
 Atom Smasher
 Batwoman
 Colossal Boy 
 Dr Fate (Eric & Linda Strauss)
 Doctor Manhattan  
 Green Lantern (Hal Jordan)
 Harley Quinn
 The Monolith
 Morgan Edge
 Nite Owl II/Daniel Dreiberg
 Nyssa Raatko
 Ragman
 Sandman (Golden Age)
 Seraph
 Whistle

Marvel Comics
 Bernie Rosenthal
 Doc Samson
 Dominic Fortune 
 Gertrude Yorkes
 Iceman
 Izzy Cohen
 Justice
 Legion
 Magneto
 Moon Knight
 Polaris
 Quicksilver
 Sabra
 Sasquatch
 Scarlet Witch
 Kitty Pryde
 Shadow Knight
 Songbird
 The Thing
 Two-Gun Kid
 Volcana 
 White Tiger (Kasper Cole)
 Wiccan

Other comic presses
  Dark Horse Comics
 The Escapist
 First Comics
 Reuben Flagg 
 Image Comics:
 Masada
 Judaica Press
 Dreidel Maidel 
 Kippah Kid 
 Magen David 
 Matzah Woman 
 Menorah Man 
 Minyan Man 
 Shabbos Queen
 Malibu Comics
 Prime 
 Mendy Enterprises/The Golem Factory
 Mendy Klein
 Rivkie Klein
 Yaakov Klein
 Sara Klein
 Reb Zushe
 New England Comics
 Arthur
 Wildstorm Comics
 Sublime

See also
 List of comic creators

References

External links
 The Jewish Supers List
 Jews in Comics bibliography
 Jewish Comics discussion forum
 Jewish Comics blog
 Thwak! To Our Enemies

 
Superheroes
Jewish